Bosko Orovic (born 13 July 1972) is a Swedish football manager who is the current head coach of Swedish Superettan club Utsiktens BK. He is also a former professional footballer who played as a forward.

Playing career 
Orovic played as a forward in Allsvenskan with both BK Häcken and Västra Frölunda IF. While a youth player at Lundby IF, he was considered one of the most promising footballing youth prospects in the world. He retired from professional football in 1996, having sustained four serious knee injuries.

Coaching career 
Following his playing career, he has managed clubs such as Qviding FIF, Syrianska FC, Gunnilse IS, Utsiktens BK, and GAIS. He is currently the manager of Utsiktens BK.

References 

1972 births
Living people
Swedish footballers
Allsvenskan players
Association football forwards
BK Häcken players
Västra Frölunda IF players
Lundby IF players